The East India Company controlled most of the subcontinent of India. No other company in history has ever governed so many people. With the exception of China, the E.I.C. controlled a larger population by the nineteenth century than any government of any country in the world.

About the list

The following list of East India Company directors is taken from the "Alphabetical List of Directors of the East India Company from 1758 to 1858", compiled by C.H. & D. Philips and published in the Journal of the Royal Asiatic Society, October 1941. This list has been compiled from manuscript records, in particular the Court Minutes and Home Miscellaneous Series, volume 764, at the India Office, amplified and checked by information mainly taken from the "Annual Register, the Asiatic Annual."

How to read the list
"The figures indicate the year of election to the Court of Directors and unless the name of the month in any particular year is given, the month is assumed to be that of April. It is important to remember that throughout the period the year of office was from April to the following April. When a span of years is shown the election dates given are inclusive."

"An asterisk placed after a year indicates that the director concerned was elected deputy chairman for that year, two asterisks, that he was chosen chairman, three, that he was first elected deputy and later in the same year appointed chairman. The abbreviations d., disq., respectively stand for died, disqualified.

List of directors

List of chairmen and deputy chairmen since 1714

Prior to 1714 the Chairman and Deputy Chairman were appointed at each meeting of the Court.

References
 C.H. & D. Philips, "Alphabetical List of Directors of the East India Company from 1758 to 1858".  Journal of the Royal Asiatic Society October 1941

Notes

East India
East India
East India Company